The Central District of Gerash County is a district (bakhsh) in Gerash County, Fars Province, Iran. At the 2016 census, its population was 46,878 in 13,136 families. The District has one city: Gerash. The District has two rural district (dehestan) includes Fedagh Rural District and Khalili Rural District.

References 

Gerash County
Districts of Fars Province